The Attorney General for India is the chief legal advisor of the Government of India and is its chief advocate in the courts. They are appointed by the President of India at the instance of the Union Cabinet under Article 76(1) of the Constitution and hold office during the pleasure of the President. They must be a person qualified to be appointed as a Judge of the Supreme Court. Hence, they must have been a judge of a high court for five years or an advocate of a high court for ten years, or an eminent jurist in the opinion of the President.

R. Venkataramani is the incumbent Attorney-General for India. He succeeded to the office as the 16th Attorney-General on 1 October 2022. His predecessor was K. K. Venugopal.

Powers, duties and functions 

The attorney general is necessary for advising the Government of India on legal matters referred to them. They also perform other legal duties assigned to them by the President. The attorney general has the right of audience in all Courts in India as well as the right to participate in the proceedings of the Parliament, though not to vote. The attorney general appears on behalf of Government of India in all cases (including suits, appeals and other proceedings) in the Supreme Court in which Government of India is concerned. They also represent the Government of India in any reference made by the President to the Supreme Court under Article 143 of the Constitution.

Unlike the Attorney General of the United States, the Attorney General of India has no executive authority. Those functions are performed by the Law Minister of India. Also the AG is not a government servant and is not debarred from private legal practice.

The attorney general can accept briefs but cannot appear against the Government. They cannot defend an accused in the criminal proceedings and accept the directorship of a company without the permission of the Government.

The attorney general is assisted by a Solicitor General and Additional Solicitor Generals. The attorney general is to be consulted only in legal matters of real importance and only after the Ministry of Law has been consulted. All references to the attorney general are made by the Law Ministry.

Fee and allowances payable 
Fee and allowances payable to the law officers (including Attorney General for India, Solicitor General of India and the Additional Solicitors General) of the Government of India are as under:

In addition to the above fee payable for cases, a retainer fee is paid to the attorney general for India, Solicitor General of India and the Additional Solicitors General at the rate of ₹50,000, ₹40,000 and ₹30,000 per month, respectively. Moreover, the attorney general for India is also paid a sumptuary allowance of Rs. 4,000 per month, except during the period of his leave.

Politicisation of the Attorney General 

It has become a tradition that the attorney general resigns when a new government is formed. The attorney general is selected by the Government and acts as its advocate, and hence is not a neutral person. Nevertheless, it is a constitutional authority, and his or her opinions are subject to public scrutiny. On several occasions however, the opinions pursued by the attorney general appear to have been extremely politicised.

During some of the AG tenures, it has been felt that the attorney general has gone too far. Niren De during Indira Gandhi replied to a question by Hans Raj Khanna stating that even the right to life can be suspended during emergency.

Similarly, in 2005, when the UPA government was planning a possible coalition with Mayawati, Milon K. Banerjee's opinion absolving Mayawati in the Taj corridor case was ignored by the Supreme Court. In a direct condemnation of the government which asked the CBI to heed attorney general Milon Banerjee's opinion and close the case against Mayawati, the Supreme Court told the agency not to go solely on the AG's opinion and place all evidence before it.

In 2009, Milon K. Banerjee's opinion absolving Ottavio Quattrocchi in the Bofors scandal has also been viewed as "devaluing and eroding the Attorney General's position".

During the UPA-II government (2009–2014), the conduct of Attorney General Goolam Vahanvati was criticised in a number of cases. In 2G spectrum case, he became the first attorney general in India's history who had to testify as a witness in a corruption case in a trial court. In late April 2013, in coal-gate scandal, Vahanvati was accused of misrepresenting facts in the top-most court of India. Again in the same case, Vahanvati's role came under scrutiny after allegations of impropriety and coercion emerged from his junior law officer, Harin P. Raval, who resigned from the post of Additional Solicitor General as a result.

List of Attorney Generals for India 
The attorney generals for India since independence are listed below:'''

References 

 
Supreme Court of India